Escape is a Sirius XM Satellite Radio music channel, available on XM channel 69, Sirius channel 69 and DISH Network channel 6069, as well as online and via a mobile app.

Escape features a beautiful music format, described as "Easy instrumental arrangements of the great melodies of the past 80 years with a touch of vocal", and plays a music from such instrumental artists as 101 Strings, Hollyridge Strings, Henry Mancini, Chet Atkins, Bert Kaempfert, Franck Pourcel, Richard Clayderman, Ferrante & Teicher, Geoff Love, Jackie Gleason, Andre Kostelanetz, Paul Mauriat, and Percy Faith, as well as vocalists such as Andy Williams, Anne Murray, Barry Manilow, Perry Como, Neil Diamond, Barbra Streisand and The Carpenters.

XM had previously featured the beautiful music format on Sunny, channel 24. In early 2006, the Sunny channel, which was owned by Clear Channel Communications, changed formats and started airing commercial interruptions as the result of an arbitration settlement with Clear Channel.  Due to the format change of Sunny and the commercial interruptions, XM created the Escape channel (channel 78, prior to the Sirius-XM merger, and channel 28 after) as a commercial-free beautiful music channel. After the merger with Sirius in 2008, Escape started incorporating more vocal tracks into its playlist (to compensate for the loss of Sirius' more soft-AC based Movin' Easy channel), but these were quickly reduced after complaints.

As of February 9, 2010, DirecTV dropped Sirius XM programming in favor of SonicTap.

Escape has occasionally been pre-empted in favor of special programming, as for a seasonal "Radio Hanukkah" format in 2009 and 2010, and a "Live Rock Labor Day Weekend" format in 2010.

On August 13, 2015, Escape was dropped from radios and DISH Network and became available only on channel 751, accessible to online users, and to users of the SiriusXM mobile application through a special subscription. The channel's creator, Marlin Taylor, veteran radio programmer for many stations and program syndicators such as Bonneville and known as "the father of the beautiful music format," retired shortly afterward. Escape was restored to Channel 69 on the satellite lineup on September 15, 2015 (on XM-based radios) and October 7, 2015 (on Sirius-based radios). It returned to the DISH Network lineup on November 12, 2015.

Core artists
Frank Chacksfield
101 Strings
Ronnie Aldrich
Percy Faith
Tommy Garrett
Franck Pourcel
Tony Mottola

References

External links
 XM Escape Website

Sirius XM Radio channels
XM Satellite Radio channels
Easy listening radio stations
Sirius Satellite Radio channels